Acrosorium is a genus of marine red algae.

Species
AlgaeBase recognises the following species:

Acrosorium acrospermum (J.Agardh) Kylin
Acrosorium amphiroae Jaasund
Acrosorium ciliolatum (Harvey) Kylin 
Acrosorium cincinnatum M.J.Wynne  
Acrosorium decumbens (J.Agardh) M.J.Wynne
Acrosorium deformatum (Suhr) Papenfuss
Acrosorium flabellatum Yamada
Acrosorium fragile W.R.Taylor
Acrosorium krishnamurthyi M.Umamaheswara Rao
Acrosorium masculatum (Sonder ex Kützing) Papenfuss 
Acrosorium minus (Sonder) Kylin
Acrosorium odontophorum (Sonder) Kylin
Acrosorium okamurae Noda
Acrosorium papenfussii W.R.Taylor
Acrosorium polyneurum Okamura
Acrosorium procumbens E.Y.Dawson 
Acrosorium yendoi Yamada

References

Red algae genera
Delesseriaceae